The legislative districts of Cotabato are the representations of the province of Cotabato in the various national legislatures of the Philippines. The province is currently represented in the lower house of the Congress of the Philippines through its first, second, and third congressional districts.

The provinces of South Cotabato (including the province of Sarangani and the highly urbanized city of General Santos), and Maguindanao (including the independent component city of Cotabato) and Sultan Kudarat last formed part of the province's representation in 1967 and 1972, respectively.

History

Prior to partition of Cotabato Province in 1966 
Initially being excluded from representation in the lower house of the Philippine Legislature in 1907, the then-non-Christian-majority areas of the Philippines — which included the Department of Mindanao and Sulu, of which the undivided province of Cotabato was part — were finally extended legislative representation with the passage of the Philippine Autonomy Act in 1916 by the United States Congress. The Revised Administrative Code (Act No. 2711) enacted on March 10, 1917, further elaborated on the manner by which these areas would be represented. The non-Christian areas were to be collectively represented in the upper house's 12th senatorial district by two senators, both appointed by the Governor-General. Five assembly members, also appointed by the Governor-General, were to represent the seven component provinces of Department of Mindanao and Sulu — Agusan, Bukidnon, Cotabato, Davao, Lanao, Sulu and Zamboanga — in the lower house as a single at-large district.

These arrangements remained in place despite the abolition of the Department in 1920. It lasted until 1935, when each of the seven provinces was provided one representative to the National Assembly of the Philippines, albeit the manner of election varying between provinces. Voters of the more Christianized provinces of Agusan, Bukidnon, Davao and Zamboanga could elect their representative through popular vote by virtue of Article VI, Section 1 of the 1935 Constitution. In the Muslim-dominated provinces of Cotabato, Lanao and Sulu, however, voter qualifications were more restrictive: the only persons allowed to vote for the province's representative were past and present municipal officials (municipal president, vice-president, municipal councilors); present senators, assembly representatives and 1935 Constitutional Convention delegates; provincial governors and members of provincial boards; and any persons currently residing in the concerned province who held any of the aforementioned positions in the past. This was the manner by which Cotabato's representative was elected in 1935.

The 1st National Assembly of the Philippines passed Commonwealth Act No. 44 on October 13, 1936, to finally give all qualified voters of Cotabato (along with Lanao and Sulu) the right to elect their own representatives through popular vote. Voters began to elect their representatives in this manner beginning in 1938.

During the Second World War, the undivided Province of Cotabato sent two delegates to the National Assembly of the Japanese-sponsored Second Philippine Republic: one was the provincial governor (an ex officio member), while the other was elected through a provincial assembly of KALIBAPI members during the Japanese occupation of the Philippines. Upon the restoration of the Philippine Commonwealth in 1945 the province retained its pre-war lone congressional district. Even after receiving its own city charter on June 20, 1959 Cotabato City remained part of the representation of the Province of Cotabato, per Section 91 of Republic Act No. 2634.

As the reduced Cotabato Province (1966–1973) 
The enactment of Republic Act No. 4849 on June 18, 1966, reduced the territory of Cotabato Province with the separation of its southern municipalities to form the new province of South Cotabato. Pursuant to Section 5 of R.A. 4849, the incumbent representative of Cotabato began to represent only the remaining portion of the province (along with the chartered city of Cotabato) in the second half of the 6th Congress, following the election of South Cotabato's separate representative in a special election held on the same day as the 1967 senatorial elections.

As the current (North) Cotabato Province (1973–present) 
On November 22, 1973, the reduced Cotabato Province was further subdivided into the provinces of Maguindanao, North Cotabato and Sultan Kudarat by virtue of Presidential Decree No. 341. All three successor provinces were represented in the Interim Batasang Pambansa as part of Region XII from 1978 to 1984. It was during this period that one of them — North Cotabato — was renamed Cotabato through Batas Pambansa Blg. 660.

The present-day (North) Cotabato Province returned two representatives, elected at-large, to the Regular Batasang Pambansa in 1984. Under the new Constitution which was proclaimed on February 11, 1987, the province was reapportioned into two congressional districts; each elected its member to the restored House of Representatives starting that same year.

The approval of Republic Act No. 10177 on September 14, 2012, increased the representation of (North) Cotabato by reapportioning the province into three legislative districts. The representatives for the newly reconfigured districts were first elected in the 2013 elections.

1st District 
Municipalities: Alamada, Aleosan, Libungan, Midsayap, Pigcawayan, Pikit
Population (2020): 398,953

1987–2013 
Municipalities: Alamada, Aleosan, Banisilan, Carmen, Kabacan, Libungan, Midsayap, Pigcawayan, Pikit

2nd District 
City: Kidapawan
Municipalities: Antipas, Arakan, Magpet, Makilala, President Roxas
Population (2020): 432,405

1987–2013 
City: Kidapawan (became city 1998)
Municipalities: Antipas, Magpet, Makilala, Matalam, M'lang, President Roxas, Tulunan, Arakan (established 1991)

3rd District 
Municipalities: Banisilan, Carmen, Kabacan, Matalam, M'lang, Tulunan
Population (2020): 443,827

Lone District (defunct)

1935–1967 
 encompasses present-day provinces of Cotabato, Maguindanao, Sarangani, Sultan Kudarat and South Cotabato, and the independent cities of Cotabato and General Santos

Notes

1968–1972 
 encompasses present-day provinces of Cotabato, Maguindanao and Sultan Kudarat, and the independent city of Cotabato

Notes

At-Large (defunct)

1943–1944 
 encompasses present-day provinces of Cotabato, Maguindanao, Sarangani, Sultan Kudarat and South Cotabato, and the independent cities of Cotabato and General Santos

1984–1986

See also 
Legislative district of Mindanao and Sulu
Legislative districts of South Cotabato
Legislative district of General Santos
Legislative district of Sarangani
Legislative districts of Maguindanao
Legislative districts of Sultan Kudarat

References 

Cotabato
Politics of Cotabato